RockCrown is the third studio album by post-grunge band Seven Mary Three. It was released on June 3, 1997 on Atlantic Records.  The album peaked at number 75 on the Billboard 200 on June 21, 1997. The album's Billboard-charting singles were "Lucky" (number 19 on Modern Rock Tracks and number 35 on Mainstream Rock Tracks) and the title track (number 17 on Mainstream Rock Tracks).

Critical reception

AllMusic's Stephen Thomas Erlewine criticized the band's musicianship for still being "a horrid cross between Pearl Jam and Grand Funk Railroad," and felt their ambition to emulate the sociopolitical issues found in Bruce Springsteen's best material was undone by their lackluster guitar work, concluding that "There are a couple of glimpses that the band could develop their own voice on Rock Crown, but the album in general finds Seven Mary Three floundering." Rob O'Connor from Rolling Stone said the band are at their best on the album's more subdued cuts like "Make Up Your Mind" and "I Could Be Wrong" than the "overblown seriousness" found on "People Like New" and "Times Like These", saying "there might be a place for them somewhere other than a Vegas Grunge Revival in the year 2020."

Track listing

Two additional songs ("The New Blues" and "A Little Hard, A Little Late") are listed in a picture of an album setlist, but are not included on the album.

Album credits
 Jason Ross – lead vocals, rhythm guitar
 Jason Pollock – lead guitar, backing vocals
 Casey Daniel – bass
 Giti Khalsa – drums

Production
Producers: Tom Morris, Jason Pollock, and Jason Ross
Engineering: Tom Morris and Brian Benscoter
Mixing: Tom Morris
Mastering: Mike Fuller and Tom Morris
Art Direction: Lane Wurster and Seven Mary Three
Graphic Design: Chris Eselgroth
Photography: Danny Clinch

References

1997 albums
Seven Mary Three albums
Atlantic Records albums